Zapier is a product that allows end users to integrate the web applications they use and automate workflows. The company is fully remote. As of 2021, it connects to more than 4,000 apps, with free and paid plans.

Overview
Zapier provides workflows to automate the use of web applications together. It is often described as a translator between web APIs, helping to increase worker productivity by saving time through automation of recurring tasks, and business processes such as lead management. Through an interface in which users can set up workflow rules to determine how its automations function, it orchestrates flow of data between tools and online services that wouldn't otherwise communicate with one another. For example, when a new business lead is added to a Google Sheets spreadsheet, that lead can be automatically entered in Salesforce and assigned to a sales representative. Additional team members can be alerted through Slack and the team lead can receive an email notification when the new lead has been contacted.

History
Zapier was founded in Columbia, Missouri by Wade Foster, Bryan Helmig, and Mike Knoop, as part of the first Startup Weekend Columbia in 2011. After initially submitting an application for the Winter 2012 funding cycle and being rejected, they then built their initial prototype with 25 apps, and were accepted to Y Combinator startup seed accelerator in the Summer 2012 funding cycle. As a result of the acceptance, the company temporarily relocated to Mountain View, California in Spring 2012. In October of the same year, Zapier received a $1.3 million seed funding round led by global venture investment firm Bessemer Venture Partners, its only venture capital funding to date. Zapier reached profitability in 2014. Sequoia Capital and Steadfast Financial bought shares from some of the company's original investors in January 2021, raising Zapier's valuation to $5 billion. It is one of the highest valued companies to come out of the Y Combinator program, and brought in $140 million in annually recurring revenue as of January 2021.

In March 2017, the company offered a "de-location package", consisting of $10,000 in moving reimbursement to employees who desired to move away from the San Francisco Bay Area. After the announcement, job applications increased by 50%. Zapier has been a fully remote company since it was founded in 2011. As of January 2022, the company employs approximately 500 people in 38 countries.

In 2020, as the Covid-19 pandemic spread, Zapier set up a $1 million small business assistance fund for struggling customers. In 2020, Zapier announced National No-Code Day, and launched a no-code competition with a $25,000 cash prize.

In 2020, fintech company Brex announced a partnership with Zapier, allowing easy workflow automation between their products.

Acquisitions
In March 2021, the company acquired Makerpad, a no-code education service and community, for an undisclosed amount.

See also
 IFTTT
 Power Automate
 Workato

References

External links

Cloud applications
Data synchronization
Remote companies
Y Combinator companies
Companies based in Mountain View, California
2011 establishments in Missouri
Automation software
Workflow applications